Julius Wolff (18 April 1882 – 8 February 1945) was a Dutch mathematician, known for the Denjoy–Wolff theorem and for his boundary version of the Schwarz lemma. He perished in the Bergen-Belsen concentration camp in 1945, shortly before the camp was liberated.

Wolff studied mathematics and physics at the University of Amsterdam, where he earned his doctorate in 1908 under Korteweg with thesis Dynamen, beschouwd als duale vectoren. From 1907 to 1917 he taught at secondary and grammar schools in Meppel, Middelburg, and Amsterdam. In 1917 Wolff was appointed Professor of differential calculus,  theory of functions and higher algebra at the University of Groningen and in 1922 at the University of Utrecht. He was also a statistical advisor for the life insurance company (or co-operative distributive society) "Eigen Hulp," (a predecessor of AEGON) with offices at The Hague.

Publications

Gallery

References

1882 births
1945 deaths
20th-century Dutch mathematicians
Dutch Jews who died in the Holocaust
People from Nijmegen
Dutch people who died in Bergen-Belsen concentration camp
Academic staff of Utrecht University
University of Amsterdam alumni
Academic staff of the University of Groningen